Falls of Acharn is a waterfall of Scotland.

See also
Acharn
Waterfalls of Scotland

References

Waterfalls of Perth and Kinross
Tourist attractions in Perth and Kinross